Harry Smith (12 Aug 1829 – 29 Sep 1910), was a British politician. He was the Liberal Member of Parliament for Falkirk Burghs July 1892 to 23 July 1895.
He married Julia Medina Jones on the 6th of August 1861 at Casterton, Westmorland, England.
Between 1874 and 1885 he was Sheriff-substitute for Renfrewshire at Greenock.
He died dsp aged 81 on the 29th of September 1910 in Poyle Lodge, Guildford, Surrey and was buried on the 3rd of October 1910 at Guildford.

References

External links 

1829 births
1910 deaths
Politics of Falkirk (council area)
Scottish Liberal Party MPs
UK MPs 1892–1895
19th-century Scottish people
Members of the Parliament of the United Kingdom for Scottish constituencies